Underdown is a surname. Notable people with the surname include:

 David Edward Underdown (David Underdown) (1925–2009), English historian
 Charles Edward Underdown (Edward Underdown) (1908–1989), English actor
 Emanuel Maguire Underdown (1831–1913), English barrister, author and industrialist
 Emily Underdown (1863–1947), English author
 George Underdown (1859–1895), English cricketer
 Harry Charles Bailee Underdown (1877–1963), English barrister and industrialist
 James Underdown (born 1960), executive director of The Center for Inquiry (CFI) West in Los Angeles 
 Thomas Underdown (16th century), English poet and translator